The Men's 200 metre freestyle competition at the 2019 World Championships was held on 22 and 23 July 2019. Sun Yang was the defending champion, and defended his title. Lithuania's Danas Rapšys finished first, but was disqualified for flinching just before the start. During the medal ceremony, Great Britain's Duncan Scott refused to shake hands with China's Sun Yang, with Sun Yang calling Scott a "loser" in response.

Records
Prior to the competition, the existing world and championship records were as follows.

Results

Heats
The heats were held on 22 July at 10:57.

Semifinals
The semifinals were held on 22 July at 21:12.

Semifinal 1

Semifinal 2

Final
The final was held on 23 July at 20:02.

References

Men's 200 metre freestyle